The Hansa-Brandenburg W was a reconnaissance floatplane produced in Germany in 1914 to equip the Imperial German Navy. Similar in general layout to the Hansa-Brandenburg B.I landplane, the W was a conventional three-bay biplane with unstaggered wings of equal span. The pilot and observer sat in tandem, open cockpits, and the undercarriage consisted of twin pontoons.

The NW and GNW of 1915 were a revised versions powered by a more powerful engine.

Variants
 W - initial production version with Benz Bz.II engine (27 built)
 NW - revised version with Mercedes D.III engine
 GNW - revised version with Mercedes D.III engine

Operators

Kaiserliche Marine

Ottoman Air Force

Specifications (NW)

References

1910s German military reconnaissance aircraft
W
Floatplanes
Single-engined tractor aircraft
Biplanes
Aircraft first flown in 1914